Joseph S. Krupa, Sr. (July 6, 1933 – September 13, 2011) was a former American football defensive tackle who played nine seasons for the Pittsburgh Steelers in the National Football League. Krupa was selected to the Pro Bowl after the 1963 season. He attended Purdue University. Krupa is a member of the Chicagoland Sports Hall of Fame.

1933 births
2011 deaths
American football defensive linemen
Pittsburgh Steelers players
Purdue Boilermakers football players
Eastern Conference Pro Bowl players
Players of American football from Chicago